Apinya Sakuljaroensuk is a Thai actress born on 27 May 1990. Apinya, also known as Saipan is one of the top Thai teen stars – she is an actress, product endorser, TV host and CM presenter.

She graduated in a bachelor of Communication Arts from Rangsit University

Career 

She debuted as a riot girl in the movie "Ploy", directed by Pen-Ek Ratanaruang. The movie premiered at the International Film Festival in Cannes in 2007. For the same movie Apinya received awards as the best supporting actress from Suphannahong National Film Awards and Asian Film Awards. Her unique character made her became overnight star.

After “Ploy,” Saiparn played in many movies. In the year 2008 she starred in the horror movie “4bia”. She acted with teen actor Mario Maurer in the romance/drama “Friendship” – and co-starred in the classic comedy sequel “Boonchoo 9.”

In Detlev Bucks movie Same Same But Different she acted alongside David Kross in the female role. She studied English every day for 3 hours and Khmer for 2 hours and even dubbed the movie in German. The movie received a Variety Piazza Grande Award at the International Film Festival organised in Locarno.

Television 
 Sitcom appointment with me. Years 1-2 are invited to a first (Channel 9).
 Sitcom bomb tom version 3 get a paintball field (5).
 I wrote Tipa look at Pana, forgiveness and girls are free (Channel 3).
 Sweet oranges, sugar, sour (Channel 7).
 Sitcom it civil the role of water (Thai PBS).
 Tadhagpleaiwand. (Channel 3).
 Strawberry Cheesecake - host
 Club Friday the Series 6: The fault, dear friend (GMM 25)
 Club Friday the Series Continued: The fault, dear friend (GMM 25)

Filmography 
 2007: Ploy
 2008: 4bia
 2008: Boonchu 9
 2008: Friendship
 2008: 4 Romance
 2009: Haunting Me 2
 2009: After School
 2009: Same Same But Different
 2009: 32 December Love Error
 2010: Boonchu Jayunaijaisamer
 2010: Sudkate Salateped
 2010: The Intruder
 2010: Three Dimensional
 2011: Sammidti (Indie Film : "Behind the Scene")
 2011: Friday Killers
 2011: Thanks for Love Together | Kob Khun Tee Rak Kan
 2011: Love Julinsee
 2011: Bangkok Sweety
 2012: Valentine Sweety
 2012: I Carried You Home
 2012: 3 AM
 2012: I Miss You
 2013: Concrete Clouds
 2013: Project Hashima
 2014: 1448 LOVE AMONG US
 2014: Fin Sugoi
 2016: Grace
 2016: By the Time It Gets Dark
 2020: The Girl In The Feather Jacket

Commercials 
 DTAC's father is buried in a (happy), All Star
 Honda Motorcycle
 Happy Thai
 Hanami (a hard roll)
 Pakking bread sticks
 Mister Donut
 Color pencils, Faber-class Tel Aviv

Music videos
 Microsoft Press Club.
 Assert (Caloric on the Lahti Lahti).
 I do not like (LCD Fine).
 Roo Mai Wa Love  with Mario Maurer
 Someone dreamed about my music (Take a meet).
 I fear the film is the fourth crossroads (Dome equipment column).
 I would also like (Trai Bhumiratana) (OST's Friendship with me) with Mario Maurer
 If I die (Slot machine).
 Know that ... Love (Pimuk Andy soot. Feat. Ants, Kalaya).
 Kiss me sweet dreams (August Band. (New York) Feat. my love tea, I was good).
 Embrace the same (Tak. Siriporn on top.).
 We are Thai (Diamond's architecture supports fortune).
 Starting at the end (Bael Mono Music).
 "Mai Ngao Mai Chai Mai" - Am Fine
 Yeun Yan - Calories Blah Blah
 Tặng anh cho cô ấy (#TACCA)(#ADODDA4) - Hương Giang

Awards and nominations
 2008 Thailand National Film Association Awards ( Won Best Supporting Actress for the movie Ploy)
 2008 Suphannahong award (Nominated)
 2008 Asian Film Awards ( Nominated for Best Supporting Actress)
 2008 Star Cinema's Award (Nominated for Best Supporting Actress)
 2008 Entertainment Critics Association Awards (Nominated)
 2008 Chalermthai Award. (Nominated for Best Supporting Actress)
 2008 Star Entertainment Award's content (nominated
 2008 Star of Siam Star Party 2008. (Won Hot young woman)
 2008 Seventeen Teens Choice Award (Won Seventeen Choice Hottie Female)
 2010 Star of Siam Star Party 2010. ( Nominated in Great Female Lead)
 2011 StarPics Awards( Nominated for Best Actress for the indie movie "Behind the Scene")

External links 

1990 births
Living people
Apinya Sakuljaroensuk
Apinya Sakuljaroensuk
Apinya Sakuljaroensuk
Apinya Sakuljaroensuk
Apinya Sakuljaroensuk
Apinya Sakuljaroensuk